Acacia fasciculifera, commonly known as scrub ironbark or less frequently as rosewood, is a tree belonging to the genus Acacia and the subgenus Phyllodineae endemic to parts of Queensland.

Description
The tree can grow to a height of up  and forms a dense canopy. It has flexuose and  pendulous branchlets that are glabrous. The light green phyllodes have a narrowly oblong to narrowly elliptic shape. It mostly flowers in the summer months between November and March. The inflorescences occur in groups of two to eight usually as axillary clusters with spherical flower-heads containing 20 to 40 cream coloured flowers.

Taxonomy
The species was first formally described by the botanist George Bentham in 1864 as part of the work Flora Australiensis. It was reclassified as Racosperma fasciculiferum in 1987 by Leslie Pedley then transferred back to genus Acacia in 2001. The only other synonym is Acacia penninervis var. stenophylla.

Distribution
It is found in Queensland from Boonah in the south up to around Bowen in the north with the bulk of the population situated between Boonah and Rockhampton. It is found on ridges and along creek lines growing as a part of Eucalyptus woodland communities.

See also
List of Acacia species

References

fasciculifera
Flora of Queensland
Plants described in 1864
Taxa named by Ferdinand von Mueller